Tom Clancy's Rainbow Six: Take-Down – Missions in Korea is a 2001 tactical first-person shooter video game developed by Kama Digital Entertainment. A non-canon spinoff of the Rainbow Six franchise by Red Storm Entertainment, Take-Down was only released in South Korea for Microsoft Windows. The game's plot follows the international counterterrorist organization Rainbow as they handle terrorism and organized crime in South Korea.

Gameplay 
Take-Down's gameplay is essentially the same as Rainbow Six: Rogue Spear, but adapted for South Korean interests, including South Korean Rainbow operatives, additional maps, new uniforms, and South Korean weapons. The game's plot is also different, set almost entirely in South Korea, and has a much shorter campaign, with only eight missions (plus two bonus missions) as opposed to Rogue Spear's eighteen missions.

Plot
Take-Down is set in an alternate universe where all Rogue Spear expansions from Covert Ops Essentials onward did not happen. Take-Down is not considered canon to the Rainbow Six series.

In 2003, Rainbow, a secret international counterterrorist organization led by John Clark, works alongside the South Korean "Special Response Team" (consisting of counterterrorism operatives from the National Police Agency, 707th Special Mission Battalion, and National Intelligence Service) and their advisor Cho Hyung-Jin, to respond to a series of terrorist attacks committed by ATX, a Palestinian anti-American terrorist group intent on forcing American withdrawal from Asia. When the ATX takes United States Forces Korea Colonel Smith hostage in Seoul, Rainbow rescues him and kills ATX's leader Hamad, but are suspicious as to how ATX attacked South Korea, as they were previously considered bankrupt.

Rainbow and the SRT soon find a connection between ATX, the Yakuza organization "Ikeshita-gumi", and ecstasy smuggling between South Korea and Japan. They learn of Kim "Yasuo" Suk-won, a Zainichi who worked as a successful hitman for Ikeshita-gumi until he was framed by Ikeshita-gumi's second-in-command Takao, due to them viewing Suk-won as a threat. Exiled, Suk-won and his friend Takahashi exacted their revenge by anonymously informing the South Korean authorities of Ikeshita-gumi's ecstasy smuggling operations, allowing police to seize 550 kilograms of ecstasy from Ikeshita-gumi. Ikeshita-gumi then hired and funded ATX and sent them to South Korea, apparently as a distraction, while Takao, head hitman Sasamoto, and around 100 other Yakuza hitmen went there separately to take back the confiscated ecstasy and locate the anonymous informant.

Rainbow and the SRT investigate antiques dealer Choi Tae-ho, who is suspected of being a local organizer for Ikeshita-gumi. After infiltrating his villa and surveilling his movements, police surround him in Insa-dong while he meets with Takao, and Rainbow kills them after they take hostages in a museum. However, Ikeshita-gumi learns Suk-won was the informant and uses Takahashi to lure him to Chuncheon. Suk-won escapes his witness protection safe house to meet Takahashi, while Rainbow and the SRT attempt to intercept both parties; however, when they arrive, they find Suk-won has been kidnapped and Takahashi has been killed. Takahashi leaves a note including an email he used to contact Suk-won, while the SRT learns Ikeshita-gumi is planning to use narco-submarines to move the ecstasy.

Rainbow and the SRT locate Suk-won and the submarines on Gadeokdo, where the remaining Ikeshita-gumi hitmen, led by Sasamoto, have been surrounded by the police and the Republic of Korea Navy, with their test submarine also trapped in the vicinity. Rainbow kills Sasamoto and the hitmen, rescues Suk-won, and shuts down Ikeshita-gumi's smuggling operation.

Three months later, Rainbow is called back to South Korea to rescue ASEAN representatives who have been taken hostage at a ski resort in Gangwon. The assailants, the anarchist Government Free Activist Organization, previously led armed protests against globalization, and launched the attack after the President of South Korea agreed to form a free-trade zone between ASEAN countries, South Korea, and Japan. Rainbow stealthily plants surveillance devices in the resort and disables its security alarm, then assaults the resort to prevent the terrorists from establishing defensive positions, killing the terrorists and saving the representatives.

Development
Kama Digital Entertainment bought the Rogue Spear game engine to develop Take-Down.

It was announced at a press conference on 5 February 2001 that Take-Down would be released in June 2001. Despite promises from Red Storm Entertainment that the game would be released internationally, the game was not released outside South Korea.

On 24 January 2001, the 1.03 patch was released, including additional missions, maps, and weapons. In the patch's new plot, set three months after the main campaign, Rainbow is sent to handle a hostage situation in Gangwon.

References

2001 video games
First-person shooters
Multiplayer online games
Take Down
Tactical shooter video games
Ubisoft games
Video games developed in South Korea
Video games set in South Korea
Video games set in 2003
Windows games
Windows-only games
Works about the Yakuza
Tom Clancy games
South Korea-exclusive video games
Zainichi Korean culture
Multiplayer and single-player video games